Meadowood Estates is a former unincorporated community in Glenn County, California, now incorporated in Orland. It lies at an elevation of 253 feet (77 m).

References

Populated places in Glenn County, California
Neighborhoods in California